Bacon Log Cabin was a cabin built as early as the 1820s in Ballwin, St. Louis, Missouri. Bacon Log Cabin is currently used as a museum of St. Louis history. It was formerly a cabin built and owned by William Bacon, who passed it on through the family, starting with his grandson, William Douglas Bacon.

History
Bacon Log Cabin dates back to early as the 1820s, built by William Bacon and named for his grandson William Douglas Bacon. It was built similar to 3 conjoined cabins, on 700 acres of farmland. The Bacon farm stretched along both sides of Henry Avenue and Woods Mill Road south of Clayton Road. All the logs used in the cabin had been cut down in areas close to the cabin, as the cabin was situated in a forested location. All the bricks used in the cabin were handmade and plastered with local materials from Samuel Berry's Brick Company which was opened in 1822 in the village of Manchester, Missouri.

In the late 1820s, William Bacon intended to build a cabin for his grandson, William Douglas Bacon. The homestead he envisioned was 4 room and 2 story, with suitable comfort and plenty of living space. The house took many years to build, and had fireplaces on both levels, a kitchen for the family cook, and several other luxurious features.

The intent of the way that the Bacon Log Cabin was plastered had an intentional heating purpose. The cabin was built two stories tall, in a forested area, which would lead to heating difficulties, especially with the materials and technology at hand in the early 1800s. The architect ended up following the design of the Swiss architect Spernelli, along with plastering techniques and a fireplace to entrap heat, in a moderate climate.

The family had occupied the house until 1889, when it was sold to another family. In 1969, Bacon Log Cabin was acquired by Old Trails Historical Society and converted to an admission-by-donation museum. The museum is paid by the St. Louis County, Missouri and has had tours sold year round for about half a century.

Original cabin
When the Bacon Log Cabin had originally been built in Ballwin, Missouri, it consisted of common 1800s building materials, such as logs, plastering and hand made bricks. The home (before being resized) was created as three conjoined cabins. The Bacon Log Cabin was very large, with 4 large rooms, an upstairs for the family cook and was a 2-story abode.

Historic landmark
The Bacon Log Cabin is one of St. Louis' many historic landmarks, as well as the Cupples House and the Ambassador Theatre (St. Louis). It was built housing, just after Missouri became a state, marking the beginning of Missouri. It was situated on a farm sizing more than 700 acres in size.

References

External links
 
 

Log cabins in the United States